The Army of the North was a military force raised in Ireland during 1689 as part of the Williamite War. It was made up of Protestants from Ulster, who declared their opposition to the rule of the Catholic James II and endorsed the Glorious Revolution.

The force was raised in opposition to the Royal Irish Army which had been purged of Protestant officers and men and replaced by Catholics. It was organised by prominent local leaders such as the young Sir Arthur Rawdon. The Army was under the control of the General Council of Union, often known as the Council of Five. They dispatched emissaries to London and received endorsement for their actions from William III.

In response the authorities in Dublin despatched troops under Richard Hamilton northwards to put down the rebellion. After the Army suffered major defeats at the Break of Dromore and the Battle of Cladyford it largely dispersed. Some of the survivors took shelter in Derry, which still held out, and took part in the successful defence of the city.

References

Bibliography
 Childs, John. The Williamite Wars in Ireland. Bloomsbury Publishing, 2007.

Military history of Ireland
Disbanded armies
Early Modern Ireland
1689 establishments in Ireland
Williamite War in Ireland